Men is an American drama television series that aired from March 25 until April 22, 1989.

Premise
A reporter, a surgeon, a lawyer and a cop bond over a weekly poker game in Baltimore.

Cast
Ted Wass as Steven Ratajkowski
Saul Rubinek as Paul Arnas
Ving Rhames as Charlie Hazard
Tom O'Brien as Off. Danny McDaniel
Kimberley Pistone as Lisa Vaneti
Candy Ann Brown as Margaret Hazard

Episodes
Five episodes were broadcast in 1989. A subsequent run in Germany in 1993 revealed a total of eight episodes, of which three have not been aired in the USA, including a pilot episode.

References

External links

1989 American television series debuts
1989 American television series endings
1980s American drama television series
English-language television shows
American Broadcasting Company original programming
Television series by Universal Television
Television shows set in Baltimore